The 1904 United States presidential election in Washington took place on November 8, 1904. All contemporary 45 states were part of the 1904 United States presidential election. Voters chose five electors to the Electoral College, which selected the president and vice president.

This election would solidify the State of Washington as a one-party Republican bastion, which it would remain at a Presidential level apart from the 1910s GOP split until Franklin D. Roosevelt rose to power in 1932, and more or less continuously at state level during this era. Democratic representation in the Washington legislature would during this period at times be countable on one hand, and no Democrat other than Woodrow Wilson in 1916 would henceforth carry even one county in the state before Catholic Al Smith carried German-settled Ferry County in 1928. Republican primaries would take over as the chief mode of political competition when introduced later in the decade.

President Roosevelt was extremely popular in Washington State because of his policies of reforming the railroads, creating a Department of Commerce and Labor and conserving the forest resources that were at the time heavily exploited by big business. Parker's re-emphasis on the Gold Standard, which harked back to Grover Cleveland, aroused no enthusiasm in Washington State. Nor did Parker's opposition to Roosevelt's policy of imperialism in the Pacific, with the result that Roosevelt's performance remains the best ever by any Presidential candidate since Washington's statehood in 1889. Parker did not win one third of the vote in a single county, and overall took just a little over nineteen percent of Washington State's ballots. In fact, with 69.95% of the popular vote, Washington would be Roosevelt's fifth strongest victory in terms of percentage in the popular vote after Vermont, North Dakota, Minnesota and South Dakota.

Socialist nominee Eugene V. Debs, whose campaign focused on trust-busting and the evils of monopoly, travelled all around the nation in a charismatic campaign that netted him over four hundred thousand votes nationwide and almost nine percent in radical Washington State. In two counties Debs indeed outpolled Parker – a fate that would befall several other Democratic nominees in the state during the next two decades.

Results

Results by county

See also
 United States presidential elections in Washington (state)

Notes

References

Washington (state)
1904
1904 Washington (state) elections